Kaasi is a Telugu language given name. It may refer to:

Films
Kaasi (2004 film), an Indian film in Telugu
Kaasi, the Telugu version of the 2018 Indian Tamil language film Kaali

Fauna
Chiton kaasi, a species of marine mollusc in the genus Chiton
Eulimella kaasi, a pyram species found in Cape Verde
Lepidochitona kaasi, a species of Lepidochitona marine mollusc
Notoplax kaasi, a species of Notoplax marine mollusc
Puposyrnola kaasi, a pyram species found in the waters off Cape Verde

See also
Kasi (disambiguation)